Marketing MBA is a triannual peer-reviewed academic journal that covers research on marketing management firms and education in marketing. The editor-in-chief  is Roman R. Sidorchuk (Plekhanov Russian Economic University). It was established in 2010 and is currently published by Green Mall Publications.

Abstracting and indexing 
The journal is abstracted and indexed in RePEc and the Russian Science Citation Index.

References

External links 
 

Russian-language journals
Business and management journals
Education journals
Triannual journals
Publications established in 2010